The Knave of Diamonds is a 1921 British silent drama film directed by René Plaissetty and starring Mary Massart, Alec Fraser and Cyril Percival. It is an adaptation of the 1913 novel of the same title by Ethel M. Dell.

Cast
 Mary Massart as Lady Anne Carfax 
 Alec Fraser as Nap Errol 
 Cyril Percival as Lucas Errol 
 Olaf Hytten as Sir Giles Carfax 
 Annie Esmond as Mrs. Errol 
 George Calliga as Tommy Hudson 
 Stephen Wentworth as Dr. Capper

References

Bibliography
 Goble, Alan. The Complete Index to Literary Sources in Film. Walter de Gruyter, 1999.

External links

1921 films
1921 drama films
1920s English-language films
British drama films
British silent feature films
Stoll Pictures films
Films directed by René Plaissetty
British black-and-white films
Films set in England
Films based on British novels
1920s British films
Silent drama films